Nicolás Samayoa Pacheco (born 2 August 1995) is a Guatemalan professional footballer who plays as a defender for Liga Nacional club Comunicaciones and the Guatemala national team.

Career

Youth career
Samayoa also played four years of college soccer at Florida Gulf Coast University between 2014 and 2017. While at FGU, Samayoa made 66 appearances, scored 6 goals and tallied 4 assists.

New England Revolution
On 21 January 2018, Samayoa was drafted in the fourth round (78th overall) of the 2018 MLS SuperDraft by New England Revolution. He signed with the club on 9 February 2018.

Samayoa made his professional debut on 5 June 2018, in a 3-2 loss to Louisville City FC in a Lamar Hunt US Open Cup game.

On 11 June 2018, Samayoa joined United Soccer League side Las Vegas Lights on loan.

New England released Samayoa at the end of their 2018 season.

Comunicaciones
On 1 January 2019, he returned to Guatemala and signed with Liga Nacional club Comunicaciones.

International
Samayoa has represented the Guatemala U20 and was selected by head coach Carlos Ruiz to participate in the 2015 CONCACAF U20 Championship, where he spent six games as an unused substitute.

He made his debut for Guatemala national football team on 15 November 2018 in a friendly against Israel which Guatemala lost 0–7.

Honours
Comunicaciones 
CONCACAF League: 2021
Liga Nacional de Guatemala: Clausura 2022

References

External links 
 
 FGU Eagles Profile
 
 

1995 births
Living people
Association football defenders
Guatemalan expatriate footballers
Guatemalan expatriate sportspeople in the United States
Guatemalan footballers
Guatemala international footballers
Florida Gulf Coast Eagles men's soccer players
Las Vegas Lights FC players
New England Revolution draft picks
New England Revolution players
Sportspeople from Guatemala City
USL Championship players
2015 CONCACAF U-20 Championship players